No. 692 Squadron RAF was a light bomber squadron of the Royal Air Force during the Second World War.

History

The squadron was formed on 1 January 1944 at RAF Graveley, Huntingdonshire as a light bomber unit, equipped with Mosquito Mk.IV bombers, as part of the Light Night Striking Force of No. 8 Group RAF in Bomber Command.  It re-equipped with Mosquito Mk.XVI bombers from March 1944 and by June 1944 the squadron had completely switched over to the newer variant.

It was the first squadron to carry 4,000 lb bombs in Mosquitos, used in an attack on Düsseldorf. The squadron was also the first Mosquito unit to carry out minelaying operations. Most operations were at low level, including one mission when the squadron dropped 4,000 lb bombs into the mouth of tunnels in the Ardennes. At the end of the war the squadron was disbanded on 20 September 1945 at RAF Gransden Lodge, Cambridgeshire.
The squadron had carried out 3,237 operational sorties (though one source claims a far lower number of sorties, 1,457) for the loss of 17 aircraft.

Aircraft operated

Commanding officers

Squadron Airfields

See also
List of Royal Air Force aircraft squadrons

References

Notes

Bibliography

External links

 No. 692 Squadron RAF movement and equipment history
 History of No. 692 Squadron
  Nos. 671–1435 Squadron Histories
 Remembrance to two fallen squadron members

692 Squadron
Bomber squadrons of the Royal Air Force in World War II
Military units and formations established in 1944
Military units and formations disestablished in 1945